The Cult is a novel by Max Ehrlich, published in 1978 by Simon & Schuster. It was the author's tenth book.

Plot 
Jeff Reed falls under the influence of a religious cult called Souls for Jesus (SFJ), led by Reverend Buford Hodges. His parents hire deprogrammer John Morse, whose daughter committed suicide after becoming a member of SFJ. They kidnap him from the SFJ, and Morse uses Chinese brainwashing techniques on him, but SFJ in turn re-kidnap and re-brainwash him, and he sues his parents and Morse. The novel ends with a court scene revealing deep penetration of the US justice system by SFJ.

Reception 
In a survey of 1970s fiction, John Sutherland called The Cult a roman à clef. A contemporary Kirkus Reviews reviewer compared the SFJ in the book to "the Moonies and the Hare Krishnas put together" and in their influence, to the Scientologists, but declared the book "numbingly obvious at every point".

References

1978 American novels
Simon & Schuster books
Novels about cults